Alim abadthe Iranian Statistics Center in 2006, its population was 351 (101 households).

One of the most important peaks in the central province of Alvand is where it is known by mistake, called the Alvand Lacan, which is a big mistake.

The tourist attractions of this village can be found in the hollow cave in the local name of the monastery or in the cave. The beautiful springs of Khatun and Gold Yellow Springs, spring only spring. Another attraction can be called the Springs and the Hill of Peaks, which is near the famous cave of bloodthirsty niches. There is another cave, which is in the form of a well near the Alvand Peak, called the Dalkhan Cave, whose depth is more than 150 meters. In the old days, the local people go to the cave to cool their drinking syrups in summer, and from there they bring snow to the mountains and the mountains. The villages of this village are many ecosystems. It is an environment of birds and birds such as gooseberries. . The ram and the wolf are a work and life. In ancient times, the Leopard lived in the mountains of the village, which was endangered by hunted hunts.

The main cultivation of this village is bean, which is one of the best beans in the central province.

Reference
 (also Romanized as ‘Alīmābād; also known as Ḩalīmābād) is a village in Shamsabad Rural District, in the Central District of Arak County, Markazi Province, Iran. At the 2006 census, its population was 351, in 101 families.

References 

Populated places in Arak County